Newfield is a small hamlet in eastern Ross-shire, in the Highland area of Scotland. Newfield is located 3 miles south of Tain.

References

Populated places in Ross and Cromarty